Wolf Peregrin Joachim Wolfensberger, Ph.D. (1934–2011) was a German-American academic who influenced disability policy and practice through his development of North American Normalization and social role valorization (SRV). SRV extended the work of his colleague Bengt Nirje in Europe on the normalization of people with disabilities. He later extended his approach in a radical anti-deathmaking direction: he spoke about the Nazi death camps and their targeting of disabled people, and contemporary practices which contribute to deathmaking.

Early life
Born in Mannheim, Germany, in 1934, Wolfensberger was sent to the countryside for two years during World War II, in order to escape the bombing. He emigrated to the US in 1950 at 16 years of age.

Education
He studied philosophy at Siena College in Memphis, Tennessee, received a Master of Arts in clinical psychology at St. Louis University, and a PhD in psychology from Peabody College for Teachers (now part of Vanderbilt University), where he specialized in mental retardation and special education.

Career
Wolfensberger worked at Muscatatuck State School, Indiana ("state school" was a term for US institutions for people with intellectual disabilities) and interned at the E.R. Johnstone Training Center, Bordentown, New Jersey. He did a one-year National Institute of Health research fellowship (1962–1963) at Maudsley Hospital, (London, England) studying with Jack Tizard and Neil O'Connor. Wolfensberger was the Director of Research (1963–1964) at Plymouth State Home and Training School (Michigan). He was a mental retardation research scientist at the Nebraska Psychiatric Institute of the University of Nebraska Medical School in Omaha from 1964 to 1971.

Between 1971 and 1973, he was a visiting scholar at the National Institute on Mental Retardation in Toronto, Canada, and was the Director of the Training Institute for Human Service Planning, Leadership and Change Agentry at Syracuse University in upstate New York until his death in 2011. He was a friend and colleague of the School of Education at Syracuse University, and supported the awarding of PhDs, "community services" contributions throughout the US and worldwide, and lent support to federal projects such as Rehabilitation Research and Training Center on Community Integration (1985–1995, to Steven J. Taylor, also Professor Emeritus) for which he was not compensated.

See also
 Normalization principle
 Social role valorization

References

Bibliography

Works by Wolf Wolfensberger
Books
 
 
Wolfensberger, Wolf P. (1977). A Multi-Component Advocacy/Protection Schema. Toronto, Ont.: Canadian Association for the Mentally Retarded.
 Wolfensberger, W. (1998). A brief introduction to Social Role Valorization: A high-order concept for addressing the plight of societally devalued people, and for structuring human services. (3rd ed.). Syracuse, NY: Training Institute for Human Service Planning, Leadership and Change Agentry (Syracuse University).
 Wolfensberger, W. (2005). The new genocide of disabled & affected people (3rd (rev) ed.). Syracuse, NY: Syracuse University Training Institute for Human Service Planning, Leadership & Change Agentry.
 Wolfensberger, W., & Zauha, H. (1973). Citizen Advocacy And Protective Services For The Impaired And Handicapped. Toronto: National Institute on Mental Retardation.
 Wolfensberger, W., & Glenn, L. (1975, reprinted 1978). Program Analysis of Service Systems (PASS): A method for the quantitative evaluation of human services: (3rd ed.). Handbook. Field Manual. Toronto: National Institute on Mental Retardation.
 Wolfensberger, W. & Thomas, S. (2007). PASSING: A tool for analyzing service quality according to Social Role Valorization criteria. Ratings manual (3rd rev. ed.). Syracuse, NY: Syracuse University Training Institute for Human Service Planning, Leadership & Change Agentry.

Academic journal articles
 
 Wolfensberger, W., Thomas, S., & Caruso, G. (1996). Some of the universal "good things of life" which the implementation of Social Role Valorization can be expected to make more accessible to devalued people. SRV/VRS: The International Social Role Valorization Journal/La Revue Internationale de la Valorisation des Roles Sociaux, 2(2), 12–14.

Secondary Sources
 
 
 
 
 
 
 
 
David Race (editor) (2003) Leadership and Change in Human Services: Selected Reading from Wolf Wolfensberger. New York: Routledge.
David Race (2006) Social Role Valorization and the English Experience. London: Whiting and Birch.

External links
 Personal website

1934 births
2011 deaths
American disability rights activists
Syracuse University faculty
Emigrants from Nazi Germany to the United States